Pekka Saarinen (born 27 July 1983) is a Finnish racing driver and head of PS Racing.

Karts

He has won the Nordic ICA Junior championship in 1997 and placed second in the Finish Junior A in 1997 and ICA Viking Trophy in 1998. He has also competed in various European Formula A and ICA championships with some success.

Formula Racing

He has competed for five years in Formula Renault 2.0 where he won the Formula Renault 2.0 Germany series in 2005 for SL Formula Racing and the Asian Formula Renault Challenge in both 2006 and 2007, accompanied by the China Challenge in 2007.

Career summary

References

External links
 
 

1983 births
Living people
Finnish racing drivers
Formula Renault Eurocup drivers
German Formula Renault 2.0 drivers
Dutch Formula Renault 2.0 drivers
Asian Formula Renault Challenge drivers